Frank "Dutch" Browning (October 29, 1882 – May 19, 1948) was a Major League Baseball player. He played one Major League Baseball (MLB) season for the Detroit Tigers in 1910. In 1909 he led the minor leagues in wins while pitching for the San Francisco Seals.

Born in Falmouth, Kentucky, Browning attended Georgetown College in Kentucky and began his baseball career in 1906 with minor leagues. In 1909, the Detroit Tigers MLB team drafted Browning in a rule 5 draft.

In the mid-1920s, Browning was part of a vaudeville quartet.

Browning died of burns received in an accidental house fire in San Antonio, Texas.

References

External links

1882 births
1948 deaths
Accidental deaths in Texas
Atlanta Crackers players
Baseball players from Kentucky
Deaths from fire in the United States
Detroit Tigers players
Georgetown Tigers baseball players
Major League Baseball pitchers
People from Pendleton County, Kentucky
San Antonio Bronchos players
Vaudeville performers
Waco Navigators players